Ruggles is an unincorporated community in Ashland County, in the U.S. state of Ohio.

History
A former variant name was Ruggles Center. The name most likely is ultimately derived from Almon Ruggles, a pioneer settler. A post office was established at Ruggles in 1828, and remained in operation until 1904.

References

Unincorporated communities in Ashland County, Ohio
1828 establishments in Ohio
Populated places established in 1828
Unincorporated communities in Ohio